Château Ferrière is a winery in the Margaux appellation of the Bordeaux region of France. The wine produced here was classified as one of fourteen Troisièmes Crus (Third Growths) in the historic Bordeaux Wine Official Classification of 1855. The Château has  planted with Cabernet Sauvignon, Merlot and Cabernet Franc. 

A second wine is produced under the label Les Remparts de Ferriere.

The estate is run by Claire Villars-Lurton, manager of Château Haut-Bages-Liberal and Château La Gurge, and wife of Gonzague Lurton, owner of Château Durfort-Vivens.

History 

The estate's name comes from its founder, Gabriel FERRIERE, who was a royal in charge of the king's hunts during the 18th century.  In 1777, he sold it to his cousins also named FERRIERE. One of them, Jean FERRIERE, will become mayor of the city of Bordeaux after Robespierre's fall, in 1795.
In 1855, took place the classification of the Medoc growths. On this occasion, Château Ferrière was classified [third growth].
The estate remained in the hands of the FERRIERE family until 1914, when it was sold to Armand FEUILLERAT, then owner of another Margaux classified growth, [Château Marquis de Terme]. 
In 1952, [Alexis LICHINE] took over the management of Château Ferrière as a farmer and all the wine was vinified at Château Lascombes, second growth in Margaux. 
During 40 years, only a small quantity of bottles is produced and the wine somehow becomes a second label for Château Lascombes. Only passengers of a famous airline had the opportunity to taste its potential.

Return of a classified growth  

In 1988, the VILLARS family purchases the vineyard and the buildings, but it is only in 1992 that the agricultural lease comes to an end. The family then takes over the management of the vineyard as well as the vinification. The estate is now owned by Claire Villars-Lurton.

A small vineyard for a great Terroir 

With 21 [classified growths in 1855], the [Margaux appellation] has more classified estates than any other commune in the [Medoc]. 
With its 12-hectare vineyard, composed of Garonne gravels laying on chalk, Château Ferrière has the smallest surface of vines of all the classified growth in 1855. A parcel of this small piece of terroir lies in the heart of the Margaux village and is rounded by an old stone wall.

Technical information

Visit 

Château Ferrière is open from Monday to Friday, from 9h00 to 12h30 and 14h00 to 17h30.

References

External links 
 

Bordeaux wine producers